Chariesthes grisescens is a species of beetle in the family Cerambycidae. It was described by Stephan von Breuning in 1981, originally under the genus Pseudochariesthes. It is known from Kenya.

References

Chariesthes
Beetles described in 1981